Evgeny Evgenyevich Korolev (born 14 February 1988) is a retired Russian-born Kazakhstani professional tennis player and the cousin of former Russian player Anna Kournikova. He began playing tennis at age four with his father, and picked up his first ATP points at age 15 in three German challenger events. He can speak Russian, German, English and Spanish.

Personal
Korolev retired from Tennis in 2016 due to persistent injuries.

Career

Early years

In 2005, he won three futures and a challenger event. He started off the year with a defeat in a German futures event, although only after beating fellow hopeful Andrey Golubev on the way. He later claimed a second futures win in France, in which he beat home favorite Mathieu Montcourt in the final. He later won another futures event in Austria and an F1 event in France. His success in these contests convinced him to start playing more challenger events, including a victory in the Aachen challenger event, in which he beat Igor Kunitsyn and Dominik Meffert on his way to the title.

In 2006 Korolev claimed a win in Marseille over fellow countryman and world number 5 Nikolay Davydenko, but went on to lose in the quarter finals to French veteran Sébastien Grosjean. Shortly after, Korolev beat former World Number 1 and Grand Slam winner Carlos Moyá, before eliminating Andreas Seppi on his Grand Slam debut at Roland Garros, before going out to Gastón Gaudio. He then won another challenger contest, but lost to Sluiter in the final of the Aachen event.

2007–2008
Korolev then went on to the Australian Open 2007, in which he lost to the eventual runner-up Fernando González. He also lost to both Radek Štěpánek and James Blake prior to the event. He then reached the semi-finals of an American contest, losing to Jürgen Melzer, after beating James Blake and Sam Querrey in the earlier rounds. Korolev then played his first masters series event in Indian Wells, in which he was eliminated by Novak Djokovic in straight sets. He later described this as a learning curve, after wins over Simon Greul and close friend Dmitry Tursunov.

He later lost in the US Open to Stanislas Wawrinka. Korolev then once again claimed the Aachen challenger title by defeating Andreas Beck in the final to win the tournament for the third time. He then played in Saint Petersburg, but went out in straight sets against the British number 1, Andrew Murray.

In 2008, Korolev also claimed victories over the likes of Paul-Henri Mathieu and Fernando González, and reached the quarter-finals in Sydney, losing to Frenchman Fabrice Santoro.

During the second round of a tournament in Las Vegas, Korolev was leading 6–3, 5–2 against number one seed Fernando González. He served for the match twice and was broken each time. He eventually prevailed in a second set tiebreak but needed 11 match points to win. He said that if he had lost that second set, he would have lost the match. In his first semifinal of the year, he lost to Nicolás Almagro in Valencia.

Korolev faced Robin Söderling in the first round in Rome. After losing in the first round at both Munich and Roland Garros, Korolev reached his third quarter-final of the year, in which he lost to the Russian number one, Nikolay Davydenko. At the US Open, Korolev beat Swedish Robin Söderling before losing to Gaël Monfils in the second round. After undergoing another hernia surgery, Korolev made a comeback on the Challenger Circuit in the fall. His biggest successes were a title win in Aachen and a semifinal showing in Düsseldorf.

2009
At the 2009 Australian Open, Korolev made his way through the qualifying rounds and beat former world number 1 Carlos Moyá, in the first round. He lost to Roger Federer in the second round 2–6, 3–6, 1–6.

At the end of February, Korolev reached his first ATP World Tour final at the Delray Beach tournament in the United States. Again starting in qualifying, he won seven straight matches (including wins over world number 38, Igor Kunitsyn, and over Guillermo García-López) before eventually falling in the final to top seed, Mardy Fish, 7–5, 6–3. This placed him back into the ATP Tour's top 100 players, at number 79.

After early losses in Masters 1000 events in Indian Wells and Miami, including a loss in the Sunrise, Florida Challenger, Korolev moved on to Houston, his first clay tournament of the year. There, he reached the semifinal, scoring wins against players such as Leonardo Mayer, Daniel Gimeno Traver, and Guillermo Cañas, before losing to the eventual champion Lleyton Hewitt 6–7, 4–6. That result brought him to the No. 72 in the world rankings.

Korolev struggled to build on that run, with Masters 1000 defeats to Juan Mónaco and Eduardo Schwank when aiming to qualify and was also put out of Munich in straight sets to Frenchman Jérémy Chardy. However, Korolev did manage to claim a victory in Düsseldorf over Andreas Seppi, later losing to both Troicki of Serbia and Máximo González of Argentina. At Roland Garros, Korolev had to pull out of a match with Gimeno Traver due to an ankle problem which had also forced him out of the doubles the week prior to the event.

His next scheduled event was at Queens Club where he was defeated by Frenchman Michaël Llodra. In Eastbourne, he bowed out to Garcia Lopez despite his previous winning record against the Spaniard. Korolev then faced good friend and fellow country man Igor Andreev at Wimbledon and lost in four sets. He has since taken part in occasional challenger events, although he admits his motivation has been hindered by the move to the lower ranks of world tennis, possibly contributing to losses against Pere Riba and Roberto Bautista-Agut.

In September 2009, Evgeny Korolev won the 17th Szczecin Pekao Open, defeating Albert Montañés 4–6, 6–3, 6–2 in the semi-final, and Frenchman Florent Serra 6–4, 6–3 in the final. He reached three straight ATP level quarterfinals. In the first, the 2009 Open de Moselle he lost to Philipp Kohlschreiber 6–1, 6–3. In the 2009 PTT Thailand Open he lost to eventual champion Gilles Simon after defeating Fabrice Santoro and Robby Ginepri. Finally, in the 2009 Kremlin Cup he lost to Illya Marchenko 0–6, 6–2, 6–3 after defeating compatriots Igor Kunitsyn and Marat Safin.

As the sixth seed he lost in the first round of the 2009 St. Petersburg Open to qualifier and eventual champion Sergiy Stakhovsky. He played his last tournament of the year in the 2009 Davidoff Swiss Indoors as a qualifier, defeating Simone Bolelli 3–6, 7–6, 6–2 and Jérémy Chardy 6–4, 7–6, before losing to top seed Roger Federer 6–3, 6–2.

2010–2011
Korolev began the year at the 2010 Qatar ExxonMobil Open and the 2010 Medibank International Sydney, in both cases reaching the second round, losing to Roger Federer and Mardy Fish respectively. In the 2010 Australian Open he reached the third round losing to eleventh seed Fernando González in five sets 7–6, 3–6, 6–1, 3–6, 4–6 after defeating 21st seed Tomáš Berdych in straight sets. He then suffered early defeats in the first round of the 2010 PBZ Zagreb Indoors to Ivan Dodig, in the second round of the 2010 Regions Morgan Keegan Championships to Philipp Petzschner, and in the second round of the 2010 Delray Beach International Tennis Championships to Jarkko Nieminen. In the 2010 BNP Paribas Open, he lost to Robin Söderling 6–2, 6–4 in the second round, after defeating Florian Mayer 6–3, 6–2. In the first round of the 2010 Sony Ericsson Open he lost to Dudi Sela 6–3, 6–3. He then fell in the first rounds of 2010 U.S. Men's Clay Court Championships, 2010 Monte-Carlo Rolex Masters, and 2010 Barcelona Open Banco Sabadell, He then broke the losing streak at the 2010 Serbia Open defeating Michael Russell 6–1, 6–0, but fell in the next round to Sam Querrey. He then fell in his next four matches at the 2010 Mutua Madrileña Madrid Open, 2010 French Open, 2010 Aegon Championships and 2010 Aegon International. He then won against Eduardo Schwank 6–1, 7–6, 4–6, 6–2 but retired in the second round of 2010 Wimbledon against Lleyton Hewitt down 2 sets to love and 0–3. He then fell in the qualifying draw of 2010 MercedesCup and first round of 2010 International German Open. He then made his best performance of the year by reaching the quarterfinals of the 2010 Pilot Pen Tennis without dropping a set but lost to Thiemo de Bakker in straight sets. At the US Open he retired against Kei Nishikori in the first round due to an elbow injury which sidelined him for the rest of the year and caused him to fall outside the top 100.

In 2011, due to his low ranking he started playing in the qualifying rounds and the challenger tour, but fell short, not being able to score back-to-back wins, until the 2011 Status Athens Open, where he reached the quarterfinals before falling to Dmitry Tursunov 7–5, 7–5.

ATP career finals

Singles: 1 (1 runner-up)

ATP Challenger and ITF Futures finals

Singles: 17 (11–6)

Doubles: 12 (7–5)

Performance timeline

Singles

References

External links

 
 
 

Tennis players from Moscow
Russian male tennis players
1988 births
Living people
Kazakhstani male tennis players
Kazakhstani people of Russian descent